Baye is a commune in the Finistère department and administrative region of Brittany in north-western France.

Population
In French the inhabitants of Baye are known as Bayois.

Geography

Historically, Baye belongs to Cornouaille.

Map

Gallery

See also
Communes of the Finistère department

References

External links

 Mayors of Finistère Association  ;

Communes of Finistère